Justicia alpina is a species of plant in the family Acanthaceae. It is endemic to Peru.

References

Endemic flora of Peru
alpina